Tepetzintla may refer to:

Tepetzintla, Puebla, a town and municipality in Puebla in south-eastern Mexico
Tepetzintla, Veracruz, a municipality in the Mexican state of Veracruz